Deep Thought or Deep Thinking may refer to:

 Deep Thought (Hitchhiker's Guide to the Galaxy), a fictional computer in The Hitchhiker's Guide to the Galaxy
 Deep Thought (chess computer), an IBM-produced chess computer, named after the Hitchhiker's Guide's Deep Thought
 Deep Thoughts (album), or The Thought Remains the Same, a 2000 compilation album by bands on Nitro Records
 Deep Thoughts by Jack Handey, a segment on Saturday Night Live consisting of one-liner jokes written and orated by Jack Handey
 Deep Thinking, a 2017 book by Garry Kasparov and Mig Greengard

See also